Nicktoons: Attack of the Toybots (known as SpongeBob to Nakamatachi: Toybot no Kougeki in Japan, and SpongeBob and Friends: Attack of the Toybots in PAL regions) is a 2007 video game sequel to the 2005 game Nicktoons Unite! and 2006 game Nicktoons: Battle for Volcano Island. It was released on Wii, Nintendo DS, Game Boy Advance, and PlayStation 2.

The game features a dozen playable characters from various Nicktoons properties of the time, including The Adventures of Jimmy Neutron: Boy Genius, The Fairly OddParents, Danny Phantom, SpongeBob SquarePants, Invader Zim, My Life as a Teenage Robot, Rocko's Modern Life, The Ren and Stimpy Show, Catscratch, El Tigre: The Adventures of Manny Rivera and Tak and the Power of Juju.

Gameplay
Nicktoons: Attack of the Toybots gameplay includes playing as two Nicktoons in some levels and piloting an operational mech suit (created by Jimmy Neutron) in others. Players journey through Bikini Bottom, Amity Park, the Ghost Zone (GBA version only), Fairy World, Pupununu Village (handheld version only), Retroville (handheld version only), and Calamitous' Lair (console version only), as well as the Toybot Factory, which is divided into multiple segments.

Plot
The game opens with Jimmy Neutron's nemesis, Professor Calamitous, being a contestant on a reality show called "The Biggest Genius". Calamitous states that by feeding fairies Krabby Patties, they can emit a magical gas that, combined with the ghost energy, can be used as a form of fuel for his army of "Toybots," evil toy duplicates of abducted and scanned heroes. During the opening credits, SpongeBob SquarePants and Patrick Star deliver a truckload of several million Krabby Patties to a Krabby Patty processing and toybot factory. Upon arriving at the factory, a robot sucks up all the Krabby Patties, and Patrick, unintentionally, in the process. SpongeBob chases after the robot, and eventually finds his way into the factory.

After finding his way through the factory, SpongeBob finds Patrick vacuum-packed like a toy. After freeing Patrick, they meet Tak of the Pupununu People, who claims to have been abducted and scanned. They later find Timmy Turner and Jimmy Neutron, who were also abducted. They then meet ChadBot, Calamitous' robot assistant, and ask him to contact Danny Phantom. ChadBot agrees to betray his master and help, and tells them to find more "master models", which are the action figures that Calamitous created from scanning the abducted heroes, for his collection. After collecting more master models, ChadBot allows Jimmy to contact Danny, who says that Calamitous' toy army took over his house to use the Ghost Portal's energy. Jimmy tells Danny and Sam to meet him and the other heroes at Amity Park's EvilToyCo outlet. When they arrive, they see that Jimmy has built mech-suits that will let them fight the larger robots. The group then defeats the Saucer Men robots that Calamitous has been using to abduct the heroes from their worlds, and head to Fairy World. Patrick frees Jorgen Von Strangle from a glass prison to destroy the Fairy Harvester, and they get back into their mech-suits to visit the Professor's lair. 

The heroes then unexpectedly enter The Biggest Genius' filming set, where ChadBot is revealed to be the winner. The host tells Calamitous that ChadBot doing Calamitous’ work for him, and building a collection of master models is what led to him winning. ChadBot credits SpongeBob, Danny, and their friends for his rise to success, and the game ends with ChadBot cutting Calamitous' mustache off with an electric shaver.

Reception

Nicktoons: Attack of the Toybots received "mixed or average reviews". Meghan Sullivan of IGN gave the Wii version of the game a score of 6 out of 10, stating that "Nicktoons: Attack of The Toybots is by no means a stellar game, but if you're a parent looking to entertain your kid for a few hours while you go out, then this might do the trick. Otherwise pass on this and wait for something better." Jack DeVries of IGN gave the Nintendo DS version of the game a score of 7 out of 10, concluding that "This is the best Nicktoons game yet. I know, that isn’t saying much since Unite and Battle for Volcano Island kind of sucked. And really, this isn't a stellar title. It gets pretty repetitive and it's not very long. But for fans of Nickelodeon cartoons, it's got enough characters and unlockables to be pretty appealing. The minor voicework is just enough to be neat, and with multiplayer and so many characters, it's actually a game that could be played multiple times. I just wish Rocko was a playable character." The Wii version of the game received a score of 60 out of 100 from Metacritic based on 4 reviews, while the Nintendo DS version of the game received a Metacritic score of 54 out of 100 based on 4 reviews.

Sequel

The game was followed by SpongeBob SquarePants featuring Nicktoons: Globs of Doom for the Nintendo DS, PlayStation 2 and Wii on October 20, 2008.

References

2007 video games
Natsume (company) games
Nicktoons video games
Nintendo DS games
PlayStation 2 games
SpongeBob SquarePants video games
The Ren & Stimpy Show video games
THQ games
Aaahh!!! Real Monsters video games
Rocko's Modern Life video games
Invader Zim video games
Danny Phantom video games
The Adventures of Jimmy Neutron: Boy Genius video games
El Tigre: The Adventures of Manny Rivera video games
Video games developed in Australia
Wii games
Video games based on The Fairly OddParents
Video games about parallel universes
Video games scored by Mick Gordon
Action-adventure games
Tak and the Power of Juju
Multiplayer and single-player video games
Video game sequels
Sentient toys in fiction
Video games about robots
Video games about toys
3D platform games
Video games featuring protagonists of selectable gender
Nicktoons Unite!
Blue Tongue Entertainment games